Livin' in a World Without You is a song by Finnish rock band The Rasmus and the first single from their seventh studio album, Black Roses. It is also first track on the album. The single was released on 10 September 2008, and was available in a variety of formats. It was performed for the first time live at the 'NRJ in the Park' festival in Berlin on 5 July 2008.

A music video for the song, produced by Nicolas Fronda, was recorded on 3 July in Stockholm and premiered on the band's web site.

Track listing 

CD single
 "Livin' in a World Without You" – 3:50
 "Livin' in a World Without You" (Acoustic Version) – 3:43
 "You Got It Wrong" – 3:17
 "Livin' in a World Without You" (Video)

Remixes Promo
 "Livin In A World Without You" (Jorg Schmid Remix) - 5:15
 "Livin In A World Without You" (Milan East Remix) - 3:53
 "Livin In A World Without You" (Jorg Schmid Radio Edit) - 3:06
 "Livin In A World Without You" (Original Radio Edit) - 3:14

Charts

Weekly charts

Year-end charts

See also 
 Black Roses

References

External links 
 

2008 singles
The Rasmus songs
Number-one singles in Finland
Songs written by Desmond Child
Songs written by Lauri Ylönen
Song recordings produced by Desmond Child
Songs written by Pauli Rantasalmi
2008 songs